Hastings East was a federal electoral district represented in the House of Commons of Canada from 1867 to 1925. It was located in the province of Ontario. It was created by the British North America Act of 1867 which divided the County of Hastings into three ridings: Hastings East, Hastings West, and Hastings North.

The East Riding consisted of the Townships of Thurlow, Tyendinaga, and Hungerford In 1903, the county of Hastings was divided into two ridings when the north riding was abolished.

The East Riding was expanded to include the townships of Madoc, Elzevir and Grimsthorpe, Tudor, Cashel, Limerick, Dunganan, Mayo, Monteagle and Carlow; the town of Deseronto, and the villages of Madoc and Tweed.

The electoral district was abolished in 1924 when it was redistributed between Hastings South and Hastings—Peterborough ridings.

Election results

On Mr. Read being called to the Senate, 24 February 1871:

|}

|}

|}

On Mr. White being unseated, 5 February 1879 
 

|}

|}

|}

|}

On Mr. Burdett's death, 20 January 1892 while still a member:

|}

|}

|}

|}

|}

|}

|}

|}

See also
 List of Canadian federal electoral districts
 Past Canadian electoral districts

External links
Riding history from the Library of Parliament

Former federal electoral districts of Ontario